RSCM may refer to:

 Royal School of Church Music, based in the UK, promotes music in Christian worship
 Dr. Cipto Mangunkusumo Hospital, Jakarta, Indonesia
 Religious of the Sacred Heart of Mary, a Roman Catholic community